Gary Chapman (born 25 September 1955) is a former Australian rules footballer who played for the Fitzroy Football Club in the Victorian Football League (VFL).

References

External links

Fitzroy Football Club players
Australian players of Australian rules football
1955 births
Living people